Nahl or NAHL may refer to:

 Nahl (surname)
 National Accident Helpline, a British personal injury lawyer service
 North American Hockey League, an American junior hockey league
 North American Hockey League (1973–1977), an American professional hockey league

See also
 An-Nahl, the 16th sura of the Qur'an, from the Arabic word for bee